The following is a list of numbered state highways in the U.S. state of New York. Signed state highways in New York, referred to as "touring routes" by the New York State Department of Transportation, are numbered from 1 to 899. A large number of unsigned state highways, known as "reference routes", are numbered from 900 to 999 and carry a suffix. Four reference routes have been signed as touring routes and as such are listed on this page.

The first set of routes in New York were assigned in 1924, replacing a series of unsigned legislative routes that had existed since 1908. Initially, there were only 29 routes; by the late 1920s, there were several dozen highways. In the 1930 state highway renumbering, some of these routes were reconfigured or renumbered while hundreds of other, smaller routes were assigned. Since that time, routes have been added and removed from the state highway system at various times for reasons ranging from the construction and/or removal of highways to the end result of "maintenance swaps", or transfers of highway maintenance from the state of New York to lower levels of government and vice versa. State-maintained portions of routes have reference markers, small, green signs that are posted approximately every one-tenth mile along the side of the roadway.

Current routes

Signed reference routes
The 900 through 999 designations are reserved for reference routes, which are unsigned state-maintained highways of varying length. Four of these routes have been signed as touring routes and are listed below.

Former routes

NY 1, NY 4, NY 6, NY 9, NY 9W, NY 11, NY 15, NY 15A, NY 20, NY 44, NY 62, NY 104, NY 202, NY 209, and NY 219 were removed due to the creation of the U.S. highways with the same number.

Reserved routes
 NY 181
 NY 188 
 NY 229 - Reserved for NY 7 between NY 7A and the New York-Pennsylvania state line. Once reserved (circa 1967) for the Nassau Expressway (now NY 878) east of the proposed Clearview Expressway near John F. Kennedy Airport.
 NY 341 - Reserved for Cortland County
 NY 381 
 NY 382 - Reserved for NY 88
NY 388 
 NY 393 - Reserved for Chautauqua Lakeway between I-86/NY 17 and NY 5
 NY 399 - Reserved for Hudson River Expressway
 NY 413 - Reserved for NY 9A
NY 435 - Reserved for NY 29A between NY 30A and NY 10
NY 450
NY 451
NY 452 
NY 478 - Reserved for Henry Hudson Parkway
NY 484 
NY 485 
NY 486 
NY 487 
NY 490 
NY 546 - Reserved for Balltown Road
NY 646 - Reserved for an old alignment of NY 146 in Schenectady
NY 656 - Reserved for NY 911E
NY 790 - Reserved for NY 49 and NY 365 (Utica-Rome Expressway, and dual carriageway Verona to Rome)
NY 819
NY 822
NY 823
NY 836
NY 841
NY 852
NY 854
NY 856
NY 862
NY 866

See also

List of state highways in the United States

References

New York State Roadway Inventory System Viewer

External links

1:24,000 NYSDOT Digital Raster Quadrangles (shows state highways)
AARoads New York Highways Page
The Upstate New York Roads Site 
New York Routes
Greater New York Roads

 State Routes
State Routes